Chinna Thambi  is a 2017 Indian Tamil-language soap opera starring Prajin and Pavani Reddy. It started airing on 2 October 2017 till 21 June 2019 on Vijay TV for 442 episodes. It is a remake of Bengali language serial Khokababu.

The story about the relationship of an innocent village boy as Chinna Thambi and an arrogant city girl as Nandhini, who fall in love after Marriage.

Plot
It is a story about Chinna Thambi (Prajin), an innocent village boy from Chinnalapatty who falls in love with Nandhini (Pavani Reddy), an arrogant girl from Chennai. Chinna Thambi is very naive, having moral values. He obeys his mother Annalakshmi sternly and loves his family. On the other side, Nandhini is opposite like Chinnathambi, But Nandhini has a good heart.

Nandhini's marriage is fixed with Gautham (Lokesh), and they get engaged. Coincidentally, one day Chinna Thambi and Nandhini meet and get into a heated argument. Chinna Thambi keeps himself away from Nandhini because he is a Baal Brahmachari. And Nandhini too dislikes him. Will they become friends and love each other? Will their love overcome their contrasting personalities, cultures, and values?

On the day of marriage, Gautham is arrested for a false accusation, and a fainted Nandhini marries Chinnathambi, on the request of her parents. Then, Nandhini moves to the village with Chinnathambi. Swetha accompanies Nandhini to help her get accustomed to the new environment. At first, Nandini hates her life in the town, with small issues such as not being able to eat meat, or wear modern clothes. One day, her father-in-law (Chinnathambi's dad) hears her speak badly of chinnathambi's looks. She remarks on the clothes and hair he has, saying he has a  priest's look. Her father-in-law brings Chinnathambi and changes his looks into something more modern, which shocks everyone in the house, including Nandini and chinnathambi's mother.

Cast

Main
 Prajin as Chinna Thambi
 Pavani Reddy as Nandhini

Recurring
 Girish as Rathnasamy (China Thambi's father)
 Anila Sreekumar as Annalakshmi (Annam) (Chinna Thambi's mother, Malar's adoptive mother)
 Rheema as Malar (Chinnathambi's cousin)
 Kammapandi as Samudram (Malar's father, Chinnathambi's uncle)
 Shwetha as Revathy (Chinna Thambi's cousin)
 Rekha Suresh as Shanthi (Malar's mother and Chinnathambi's aunt)
 Shridhar as Rajasekar (Nandhini, Arvind's father)
 Sadhana as Prabhavathi (Nandhini and Arvind's mother)
 Krishna Kishore as Nandini's elder brother
 Shwetha as Shwetha (Nandini's sister-in-law)
 Aravish  / VJ Pappu as Aravind (Pappu) (Nandhini's younger brother)
 Krithika as Varsha (Nandini's cousin)
 Priya as Kanchana (Varsha's mother and Nandhini's aunt)
 Lokesh Bhaskaran as Gautham Vasudevan 
 Britto as Seval (Chinnathambi's friend)
 Hema Rajkumar as Sevanthi (episode 174–272, dead in serial)
 --- as Meshtri
 Subageetha as Shenbagam (Sevvanthi's sister, episode 174–273)
 Suresh as Sethu (Shenbagam's husband, episode 174–270)
 Udhay as Lingam (a man who gives loan for auto, died in serial)
 Suryakanth as Chiyaan
 Andrew Jesudoss as Paramasivam
 Vadivukkarasi as Kadambavanathu Amma 
 Sairatheya as Damayenthi (devotee of Kadambavanathu Amma)
 Karthik as Kaali - Wrestler
 --- as Soman (Kaali's PA)
 Priya as Sathya (Nandhini's friend)
 Ravishankar/Ravi Varma as Vasudevan (Gautham's father)
 Uma Rani (Gautham's mother)
 Chitra
 Nithin as Ashwin
 Chetna as Preethi
 Franklin as Appu (Nandhini's friend)
 Sharanya Turadi (episode 120–121)
  Myna Nandhini as Alabarai Myna (episode 335 - 370)

Crossover episode
Chinnathambi had crossover episodes with Aranmanai Kili (364-373 episodes).
Arjun, Jaanu, and Vijaya visit Chinnathambi's house for Chinnathambi parent's 60th wedding anniversary.
Selva up calls Arjun and seeks his help to Chinnathambi construction business.
Arjun gives financial aid for Nandini and Chinnathambi's construction business (403-404 episodes).

Casting
The series is a village love story. Prajin, formerly of the series Anjali and Kadhalikka Neramillai plays the lead male role, and Pavani of the serial Rettai Vaal Kuruvi, EMI-Thavanai Murai Vazhkai, and Vajram movie plays the lead female role. Kalyanam Mudhal Kadhal Varai fame Lokesh was selected to the role of Gautham (Nandhini's Fiancé) and Saravanan Meenatchi (season 2) fame Priya and Franklin were selected to the role of Sathya and Appu.

Title
This title was taken from a 1991 Chinna Thambi movie starring Prabhu and Khushbu. The English translation of the title is Little Brother.

Development
On 23 September 2017, the first promo of the show one minute 'Promo 1' was released by Vijay TV on YouTube.

Awards and nominations

Adaptations

References

External links
 Official website at Hotstar

Star Vijay original programming
Tamil-language romance television series
2017 Tamil-language television series debuts
Tamil-language television series based on Bengali-languages television series
Tamil-language television shows
2019 Tamil-language television series endings